Rouennaise sauce (fr. Sauce Rouennaise) is a Bordelaise sauce with the addition of puréed duck liver. This sauce is served with Canetons à la Rouennaise, which was one of the dishes served at the famous "Dinner of the Three Emperors".

See also
 List of duck dishes

References

French sauces
Brown sauces
Duck dishes